John Stevens (1929 – 12 January 2016) was a crime reporter for the London Evening Standard who was known for his close contacts with Scotland Yard.

References 

English male journalists
1929 births
2016 deaths
People from Sunbury-on-Thames
People educated at Kingston Grammar School